Joseph Jeremiah McCarthy (August 10, 1911 – June 15, 1996) was a mustang officer in the United States Marine Corps Reserve, who served during World War II and the Korean War. He was also the Superintendent of Ambulances in the Chicago Fire Department; 
however, with respect for his wartime heroics, firefighters continued to address him by his wartime military rank of “Captain.”

Marine Corps Service

On February 20, 1937, McCarthy first enlisted in the Marine Corps in Chicago, and served for four years. He re-enlisted following the attack on Pearl Harbor, and returned to active duty in February 1942. In June of that year, he was discharged with the rank of first sergeant, in order to accept a commission in the Marine Corps Reserve.

McCarthy joined the 4th Marine Division shortly thereafter, and went overseas in January 1944. While deployed, he took part in the Roi-Namur, Saipan-Tinian, and Iwo Jima campaigns. In 1944, he was awarded the Silver Star for heroism as a rifle company commander on Saipan. He received the Purple Heart with Gold Star for wounds received in action on Saipan and Iwo Jima.

On Iwo Jima, McCarthy was the company commander of G Co. 2nd Battalion 24th Marines. He landed on yellow beach 2 alongside the 23rd Marines. On D plus 3, the 24th RCT relieved the 25th. His battalion moved, and was supported by the blue beaches. On February 21, 1945, as a captain, he earned the Medal of Honor, while leading an assault team across exposed ground to wipe out positions holding up the advance of his company at airfield No. 2. It is believed that a Seabee heavy weapons platoon provided the fire support he needed that day. (Fig. 1) On October 5, 1945, President Harry S. Truman presented the Medal of Honor to McCarthy in ceremonies at the White House.

Released from active duty following the war, he continued to serve in the Marine Corps Reserve, and was eventually promoted to the grade of lieutenant colonel.

“I would hope and pray there never be another Medal of Honor issued,” McCarthy remarked in a 1992 interview. “I hope and pray there's never any more wars.”

Medal of Honor citation

The President of the United States in the name of The Congress takes pride in presenting the MEDAL OF HONOR to:  
            

for service as set forth in the following CITATION:

For conspicuous gallantry and intrepidity at the risk of his life above and beyond the call of duty as commanding officer of a rifle company attached to the 2nd Battalion 24th Marines|, 4th Marine Division, in action against enemy Japanese forces during the seizure of Iwo Jima, Volcano Islands, on 21 February 1945. Determined to break through the enemy's cross-island defenses, Capt. McCarthy acted on his own initiative when his company advance was held up by uninterrupted Japanese rifle, machine gun, and high-velocity 47mm. fire during the approach to Motoyama Airfield No. 2. Quickly organizing a demolitions and flamethrower team to accompany his picked rifle squad, he fearlessly led the way across 75 yards of fire-swept ground, charged a heavily fortified pillbox on the ridge of the front, and, personally hurling hand grenades into the emplacement as he directed the combined operations of his small assault group, completely destroyed the hostile installation. Spotting two Japanese soldiers attempting an escape from the shattered pillbox, he boldly stood upright in full view of the enemy, and dispatched both troops before advancing to a second emplacement under greatly intensified fire, and then blasted the strong fortifications with a well-planned demolitions attack. Subsequently entering the ruins, he found a Japanese taking aim at one of our men, and, with alert presence of mind, jumped the enemy, disarmed, and shot him with his own weapon. Then, intent on smashing through the narrow breach, he rallied the remainder of his company, and pressed a full attack with furious aggressiveness, until he had neutralized all resistance and captured the ridge. An inspiring leader and indomitable fighter, Capt. McCarthy consistently disregarded all personal danger during the fierce conflict, and, by his brilliant professional skill, daring tactics, and tenacious perseverance in the face of overwhelming odds, contributed materially to the success of his division's operations against this savagely defended outpost of the Japanese Empire. His cool decision and outstanding valor reflect the highest credit upon Capt. McCarthy, and enhance the finest traditions of the U.S. Naval Service.

Silver Star citation
Citation:

The President of the United States of America takes pleasure in presenting the Silver Star to Captain Joseph Jeremiah McCarthy (MCSN: 0-11098), United States Marine Corps Reserve, for conspicuous gallantry and intrepidity as Commanding Officer of Company G, Second Battalion, Twenty-fourth Marines, FOURTH Marine Division, in action against enemy Japanese forces on Saipan, Marianas Islands, 4 July 1944. With his company in a defensive position and receiving intense and accurate enemy rifle and machine-gun fire, Captain McCarthy gallantly left cover to answer the cries of the wounded after two hospital corpsmen had been shot in quick succession while attempting to aid a wounded officer. Finding one of the men still alive, he attempted to remove him to safety, despite the withering enemy fire, but during this endeavor, the wounded man was shot through the head, and died in Captain McCarthy's arms. His outstanding courage, unselfish efforts, and gallant devotion to duty were in keeping with the highest traditions of the United States Naval Service.

After the War
In 1949, McCarthy drove from Maine to North Carolina in order to visit the families of twenty-six Marines that had been killed on Iwo Jima. He told each family that their man had been just as brave as he was, just not as lucky. After the war, McCarthy moved to the Near West Side, residing at 720 West Vernon Park Place for a time.

McCarthy was the Grand Marshal of the City of Chicago's Saint Patrick's Day Parade in 1959.

McCarthy retired from the Marine Corps Reserve in 1971, and from the Chicago Fire Department in 1973.  Thereafter, he and his wife split their time between their homes in Wisconsin and Delray Beach, Florida. His wife, Anita, died in 1978. The couple had no children.

The building that houses the Headquarters of the 2nd Battalion 24th Marines in Chicago is named in  his honor. Lt. Col. McCarthy was buried at Arlington National Cemetery following a funeral mass at Holy Name Cathedral in Chicago.

Of note
His military record lists his year of birth as 1911, but it is inscribed as 1912 on his headstone.

See also

List of Medal of Honor recipients
List of Medal of Honor recipients for World War II
List of Medal of Honor recipients for the Battle of Iwo Jima
Battle of Iwo Jima
2nd Battalion 24th Marines
Naval Mobile Construction Battalion 133

Notes

References

Further reading
 Includes background on McCarthy's Fire Department career.

1911 births
1996 deaths
United States Marine Corps personnel of World War II
Burials at Arlington National Cemetery
Military personnel from Chicago
American people of Irish descent
United States Marine Corps Medal of Honor recipients
Recipients of the Silver Star
United States Marine Corps officers
Battle of Iwo Jima
World War II recipients of the Medal of Honor